Mount is often used as part of the name of specific mountains, e.g. Mount Everest.

Mount or Mounts may also refer to:

Places 
 Mount, Cornwall, a village in Warleggan parish, England
 Mount, Perranzabuloe, a hamlet in Perranzabuloe parish, Cornwall, England
 Mounts, Indiana, a community in Gibson County, Indiana, United States

People
 Mount (surname)
 William L. Mounts (1862–1929), American lawyer and politician

Computing and software
 Mount (computing), the process of making a file system accessible
 Mount (Unix), the utility in Unix-like operating systems which mounts file systems

Displays and equipment
 Mount, a fixed point for attaching equipment, such as a hardpoint on an airframe
 Mounting board, in picture framing
 Mount, a hanging scroll for mounting paintings
 Mount, to display an item on a heavy backing such as foamcore, e.g.:
 To pin a biological specimen, on a heavy backing in a stretched stable position for ease of dissection or display
 To prepare dead animals for display in taxidermy
 Lens mount, an interface used to fix a lens to a camera
 Mounting, placing a cover slip on a specimen on a microscopic slide
 Telescope mount, a device used to support a telescope
 Weapon mount, equipment used to secure an armament
 Picture mount

Sports
 Mount (grappling), a grappling position
 Mount, to board an apparatus used for gymnastics, such as a balance beam

Other uses
 Mount, in copulation, the union of the sex organs in mating
 Mount, a riding animal
 Mount, or Vahana, an animal or mythical entity closely associated with a particular deity in Hindu mythology
 Mount, to add butter to a sauce in order to thicken it, as with beurre monté

See also

 
 
 The Mount (disambiguation)
 Mountain (disambiguation)
 Massif (disambiguation)
 Hill (disambiguation)